Tekes County is a county within the Xinjiang Uyghur Autonomous Region and is under the administration of the Ili Kazakh Autonomous Prefecture. It contains an area of 8,067 km2. According to the 2002 census, it has a population of 150,000.

The county center is known for being a planned community with a shape of a ba gua.

Administrative divisions 
Town (镇	)
Tekes Town (特克斯镇)
Township (乡)
Koksu Township (科克苏乡) | Qilewuzeke Township (齐勒乌泽克乡) | Qilaketiereke Township (乔拉克铁热克乡) | Karadala Township (喀拉达拉乡) | Karatokay Township (喀拉托海乡)
Ethnic Township (民族乡)
Hujierte Mongol Ethnic Township (呼吉尔特蒙古族乡) | Kökterek Kyrghiz Ethnic Township (阔克铁热克柯尔克孜族乡)
Other (其他)
托斯曼牧场 | 萨尔阔布牧场 | 克孜勒布拉克牧场 | 喀拉达拉牧场 | 特克斯军马场 | 科克苏林场 | 农四师78团

Climate

References 

County-level divisions of Xinjiang
Ili Kazakh Autonomous Prefecture